San Bonifacio is a comune (municipality) in the Province of Verona in the Italian region Veneto, located about  west of Venice and about  east of Verona.

San Bonifacio borders the following municipalities: Arcole, Belfiore, Gambellara, Lonigo, Monteforte d'Alpone, and Soave.

Main sights
Abbey of St. Peter, founded in the 7th century. It is a Romanesque church with an apse and two aisles. Notable are the crypt and the imposing bell tower, dating to 1131.
Cathedral (12th century, but mostly rebuilt in 1437)
Church of St. Abondius (15th century)

People
Germano Mosconi (1932–2012), journalist
Davide Rebellin (1971-2022), road bicycle racer

Economy
Perlini International SpA was established in San Bonifacio in 1957 by Robert Perlini.

Transport
 San Bonifacio railway station

References

External links
 Official website

Cities and towns in Veneto